Gavon Nicaughter Brown (born 14 October 1993) is a Jamaican cricketer who has played for the Jamaican national side in West Indian domestic cricket. He is a right-handed batsman and left-arm fast-medium bowler.

Brown was born in Saint Thomas Parish. He made his first-class debut for Jamaica during the 2014–15 Regional Four Day Competition, against Trinidad and Tobago. Opening the bowling with Jason Dawes, Brown took a wicket in each innings on debut, finishing with figures of 1/47 and 1/28. He had also been named in Jamaica's squad for the 2014–15 Regional Super50, but did not play a match.

He made his List A debut for Jamaica in the 2016–17 Regional Super50 on 1 February 2017.

References

External links
Player profile and statistics at CricketArchive
Player profile and statistics at ESPNcricinfo

1993 births
Living people
Jamaica cricketers
Jamaican cricketers
People from Saint Thomas Parish, Jamaica